Alex Infascelli (born 9 November 1967) is an Italian director, screenwriter and producer.

Life and career 
Born in Rome, the son of the producer Roberto and the nephew of the producer Carlo, Infascelli started his career as an assistant director for commercials and music videos. After directing he himself a number of music videos, in 1994 he directed a segment of the anthology film DeGenerazione. In 2000 he made his feature film debut with the thriller Almost Blue, which was well received both by critics and audience. For this film he won the David di Donatello for Best New Director as well as the Ciak d'oro and the Nastro d'Argento in the same category.

Filmography 
 DeGenerazione (1994, segment "Vuoto a rendere") 
 Esercizi di stile (1996, segment "Se le rose pungeranno") 
 Almost Blue (2000) 
 The Vanity Serum (2004) 
 Hate 2 O (2006)  
 Donne assassine (TV, 2008)  
 Nel nome del male (TV, 2009) 
 S Is for Stanley (2015)
 My Name Is Francesco Totti (2020)

References

External links 
 

1967 births
21st-century Italian people
Italian film directors
Italian screenwriters
Italian male screenwriters
Italian film producers
Writers from Rome
David di Donatello winners
Nastro d'Argento winners
Ciak d'oro winners
Living people
Giallo film directors